Harpers Ferry is the name of several places in the United States of America:
Harpers Ferry, Iowa, a city in Allamakee County, Iowa
Harpers Ferry, West Virginia, a town in Jefferson County, West Virginia
John Brown's raid on Harpers Ferry (1859)
Harpers Ferry Armory, second federal armory (construction begun 1799) and site of John Brown's slave revolt of 1859
Harpers Ferry National Historical Park
Battle of Harpers Ferry (September 12–15, 1862), a battle in the American Civil War that took place around what is now Harpers Ferry, West Virginia

Harpers Ferry may also refer to:
 Harpers Ferry class dock landing ship, a ship class in the United States Navy
 USS Harpers Ferry (LSD-49), a Harpers Ferry class dock landing ship of the United States Navy, commissioned in 1995
 Harpers Ferry (nightclub), a music venue and nightclub in Boston
 Harper's Ferry flintlock pistol

See also
Harpur's Ferry, A student volunteer ambulance service in Binghamton University